PGE Skra Bełchatów 2014–2015 season is the 2014/2015 volleyball season for Polish professional volleyball club PGE Skra Bełchatów.

The club will compete in:
 Polish Championship
 Polish Cup
 CEV Champions League
 ENEA Polish SuperCup

Team roster

Squad changes for the 2014–2015 season
In:

Out:

Most Valuable Players

PlusLiga

General classification

Results, schedules and standings

2014 ENEA Polish SuperCup
On October 8, 2014 PGE Skra as the Polish Champion 2014 played with ZAKSA Kędzierzyn-Koźle (winner of Polish Cup2014) for the ENEA Polish SuperCup2014. PGE Skra won 3-1 at Arena Poznań in Poznań. Facundo Conte was awarded a title of the Most Valuable Player.

2014–15 PlusLiga

Regular season

Quarterfinal

Semifinal

3rd place

2014–15 Polish Cup

7th round

Quarterfinal

Semifinal

2014–15 CEV Champions League

Pool F
In season 2014/2015 PGE Skra has been playing in 2014–15 CEV Champions League. They won all matches in Pool F with Precura Antwerpen, Hypo Tirol Innsbruck, Jihostroj České Budějovice, with a perfect record, winning 18 and losing only 2 sets along the way.

Playoff 12
In playoff 12 beat Italian club Cucine Lube Treia twice - 3–0 in Macerata and 3–1 at Atlas Arena, Łódź.

Playoff 6
They went to playoff 6, where their opponents were Italian Sir Safety Perugia. PGE Skra lost their first match with Italian team (2-3) and gained 1 point. In revenge match, on March 11, 2015 at Atlas Arena, Łódź PGE Skra Bełchatów beat Sir Safety Perugia 3-1, gained 3 points and went to the Final Four, which will be held in Berlin. In second match the best scorers of Polish club were Facundo Conte (17 points), Mariusz Wlazły (14) and Michał Winiarski (10), who came back to playing after injury. PGE Skra will play with another Polish team - Asseco Resovia Rzeszów and for the first time in history two Polish teams will be playing at semifinal of CEV Champions League Final Four.

Final four
On March 28, 2015 Asseco Resovia Rzeszów beat PGE Skra Bełchatów in semifinal of 2014–15 CEV Champions League Final Four held at  Max-Schmeling-Halle, Berlin. It was a historic match, where the semi-final played two Polish teams. Next day, PGE Skra lost with host team - Berlin Recycling Volleys and took 4th place in Final Four.

References

PGE Skra Bełchatów seasons